The Thorn is an EP recorded by English rock band Siouxsie and the Banshees. It was released in late 1984 by Polydor and remastered in 2004 to be included on the Downside Up box set.

Background, content and recording 
The purpose of the EP was three-fold: Siouxsie stated that she wanted to induct new guitarist John Valentine Carruthers into the Banshees, to try out some string arrangements, and to simply re-record tracks that had evolved on tour.

The Thorn features four of the band's tracks recorded with orchestral instrumentation: "Overground" originally appeared on the Banshees' debut album The Scream; "Placebo Effect" was a song from their second album Join Hands, while "Voices" and "Red Over White" were previously released as B-sides from the singles "Hong Kong Garden" and "Israel", respectively. The recording took place in Bavaria, in Germany.

Release 
The Thorn was released on 19 October 1984 by record label Polydor. The songs from the EP were later included on the fourth disc of Downside Up, a collection of the band's B-sides.

Track listing

Personnel 
Siouxsie and the Banshees
 Siouxsie Sioux – vocals
 Steven Severin – bass
 Budgie – drums
 John Valentine Carruthers – guitar

 Additional personnel
 The Chandos Players – orchestration
 Sam Artiss – conduction
 Gini Ball – strings on "Red Over White"
 Anne Stephenson – strings on "Red Over White"
 Martin McCarrick – string arrangements
 Bill McGee – string arrangements
 Gini Ball – string arrangements
 Anne Stephenson – string arrangements

References 

1984 EPs
Siouxsie and the Banshees EPs
Polydor Records EPs